Driss Debbagh (in Arabic : إدريس الدباغ) (born November 7, 1921 in Marrakech, Morocco – 1986), was a Moroccan ambassador to Italy (1959–1961) and a minister of commerce, industry, mining and merchant navy (from June 1963 to November 1963). He was also vice-president and chairman of Banque Commerciale du Maroc through a private company NAMIRI S.A. of which he owned 93% of the shares.

Driss Debbagh was the son of Tayed ibn Brahim Debbagh and his second wife Zahra bint Mohammed Soussi. He was fluent in Berber, Arabic, French, English and Italian. He lived in France in the end of the 1940s and he received a bachelor in chemical engineering in 1950 from L'École Nationale Supérieur des Arts et Industries Textiles de Roubaix, France. He returned to Morocco and became the president of the royal federation of aeronautic sports in 1957, and president of the CJP (Centre des Jeunes Patrons) the same year.

Awards 

Knight of the Grand Cross of the Order of Merit of the Republic of Italy (Italian: Cavaliere di Gran Croce Ordine al Merito della Repubblica Italiana)
 While he was ambassador in Rome, H.E. Driss Debbagh received a distinction from Pope John XXIII.  (Italian: S.E.)

Sources 
 Driss Debbagh Ambassador of Morocco to Rome from 1959 to 1961 (Italian)
 History of the governments, Driss Debbagh minister of commerce, industry, mining and merchant navy from June 1963 to November 1963, ministerial changes of the 8th government (French)
 Pure Gold, translation of the book Al-Ibriz in English   ,

See also 
 Portrait of Driss Debbagh
 Mohammed al-Mokhtar Soussi

People from Marrakesh
1921 births
Ambassadors of Morocco
Ambassadors of Morocco to Italy
Government ministers of Morocco
1986 deaths